The 2010–11 Notre Dame Fighting Irish women's basketball team represented the University of Notre Dame in the 2010–2011 NCAA Division I women's basketball season. The Irish, coached by Muffet McGraw, play their home games at the Edmund P. Joyce Center in South Bend, Indiana. The Fighting Irish, members of the Big East Conference, finished runners-up in the Big East regular season and conference tournament, and also in the NCAA tournament.

2011 NCAA Tournament
In the 2011 NCAA Division I women's basketball tournament, Notre Dame advanced through the rounds, beating two #1 seeds—the Tennessee Lady Volunteers and UConn Huskies—en route to the final. In so doing, they became the first team ever to defeat Tennessee and UConn in the same NCAA women's tournament. The Irish lost to Texas A&M in the national title game.

References

Notre Dame Fighting Irish women's basketball seasons
Notre Dame Fighting Irish
Notre Dame
NCAA Division I women's basketball tournament Final Four seasons
Notre Dame Fighting Irish
Notre Dame Fighting Irish